General Francisco de la Lastra y de la Sotta (October 4, 1777 – May 13, 1852) was a Chilean military officer and the first Supreme Director of Chile (1814).

Biography
He was born in Santiago de Chile, the son of Antonio de la Lastra Cortés and of María de la Sotta y Águila. As a young man, he was sent to Spain to pursue his studies, and served in the Royal Spanish Navy, was promoted to navy lieutenant in 1803, and remained till 1807. He returned to Chile in 1811. From the very beginning was a part of the independence movement that swept Chile from 1810 onwards. Once back he held different military assignments, enlisted in the revolutionary army, and was appointed political and military governor of Valparaiso. He organized in that port the militia and naval reserve, and also established arsenals for its defence.

In 1811, he was a substitute Deputy (representing Concepcion) to the first National Congress, that met between July 4 and December 2 of that year. On October 26, 1812, he was also one of the signatories of the Constitutional Regulation of 1812. He was named governor of Valparaiso and also was the first commander of the just created Chilean navy between 1812 and 1814. Since he had relations with the Carrera family (his brother, Manuel de la Lastra was married to Javiera Carrera, the sister of José Miguel Carrera) de la Lastra assumed power after the first (second for some) dictatorship of José Miguel Carrera, while he was going to fight against the Spanish troops commanded by Antonio Pareja and later by Gabino Gainza.

On March 14, 1814, he was chosen Supreme Director of Chile and promoted to full colonel. He governed with this title until July 23, 1814. He then was forced to sign the Treaty of Lircay with the Spanish and to change back the flag created by Carrera to the Spanish flag. He was deposed as a consequence of this event. At this point Carrera came back to Santiago and started his second (third for some authorities) dictatorship. After the defeat of Rancagua, on October 2, 1814, Francisco de la Lastra was taken prisoner and sent to Juan Fernández Islands (a group of islands located west to América) where he suffered many privations.

He was liberated after the victory of Chacabuco, re-entered the service, and, after attaining the rank of colonel, was for the second time appointed (in 1817) governor and general commander of the navy at Valparaiso. In 1823 he was promoted to Intendant of Santiago and Privy Councillor. As such, he became temporary Supreme Director, from December 30, 1823 until January 3, 1824, while the proprietary, General Ramon Freire, was away. In the same year he was commissioned by the government to arrange and organize the navy.

In 1825 he was appointed for the third time governor of Valparaiso. In 1829 he was charged with the general inspection of the army, and soon afterward appointed minister of war and the navy, with the charge of reorganizing the navy. That year he attained the rank of Navy Captain and Brigade General. He participated in the Chilean Civil War of 1829.

He then retired from public life till 1839, and in 1841 became a member of the court of appeals. In 1841 also he was named a member of the Marcial Court.  He was elected a deputy to congress for Lautaro, between 1843 and 1846; and became the vice-president of the chamber on November 11, 1844. He died in Santiago, on May 13, 1852.

1777 births
1852 deaths
People from Santiago
Supreme Directors of Chile
Heads of state of Chile
People of the Chilean War of Independence
People of the Chilean Civil War of 1829–30
Chilean Army generals
Chilean Navy officers